The 2011 Icelandic Men's Football League Cup was the 16th season of the Icelandic Men's League Cup, a pre-season professional football competition in Iceland. The competition started on 17 February 2011 and concluded on 25 April 2011. KR Reykjavík were the reigning champions, having won their fourth League Cup the year before.

The 24 teams from the Úrvalsdeild karla and 1. deild karla were divided into 3 groups of 8 teams. Every team played every other team of its group once, either home or away. In a change from last year's competition, only four clubs will progress to the knockout stages of the competition. Each group winner and the best group runner-up will enter the semi-finals.

Group stage
The games were played from 17 February to 16 April 2011.

Group 1

Group 2

Group 3

Knockout stage
Source: ksi.is

Semifinals
The games were played on 20 and 21 April 2011.

Final

External links
Icelandic FA

Deildabikar
Deildabikar
Icelandic Men's Football League Cup